Kvong is a small town with a population of only 207 (1 January 2020) located in Varde Municipality in the southwestern part of the Danish peninsula of Jutland.

References

External links
 Town's official website

Cities and towns in the Region of Southern Denmark
Varde Municipality